Ante Pavić (born 7 March 1989) is an inactive Croatian professional tennis player. His highest singles ranking is No. 132 achieved on 13 October 2014. He qualified for the main draw in the 2014 French Open after saving a match point in the final round of qualifying against Thanasi Kokkinakis.

Challenger and Futures finals

Singles: 9 (5–4)

Doubles: 37 (26–11)

References

External links
 
 

1989 births
Living people
Croatian male tennis players
People from Ogulin